The Continental Club Rugby League is an annual European rugby union competition organised by the Russian Rugby Federation (RRF). It is the third-tier competition for European clubs behind the European Rugby Challenge Cup and the European Rugby Champions Cup. This competition was created in 2019 after the European Rugby Continental Shield folded just six seasons upon its formation as the qualifying competition for the entry of tier two country teams outside the Premiership Rugby, Top 14 and the Pro14 into the European Rugby Challenge Cup.

The Continental Club Rugby League is planned to be contested between 8 teams; 4 of the best teams from Russia's Rugby Premier League, 3 of the best teams from Romania's SuperLiga and the champions of Germany's Rugby-Bundesliga.

The first and only season was cancelled due to the COVID-19 pandemic.

Current Teams

Team details
Below is the list of coaches, captains and stadiums for each team.

Format

Competition

Knock-out stage
The eight participant teams from the countries Russia, Romania and Germany will be drawn into a single match to play against one another in a quarter-final format where the winners of their respective matches will advance to the semi-finals of the Continental Club Rugby League while the losers will be eliminated immediately.

Then, the winners of the semi-finals will be placed in a final to contest against each other for the title whereas the losers of the two semi-finals will be competing for the 3rd place final instead.

See also

European Rugby Champions Cup
European Rugby Challenge Cup
Rugby Premier League 
SuperLiga 
Rugby-Bundesliga

References

Rugby union competitions in Europe for clubs and provinces
Recurring sporting events established in 2019
2019 establishments in Europe
Sports leagues established in 2019
Professional sports leagues in Germany
Professional sports leagues in Romania
Professional sports leagues in Russia
Multi-national professional rugby union leagues
Multi-national professional sports leagues